Elon College Historic District is a national historic district located on the campus of Elon University at Elon, Alamance County, North Carolina. It encompasses 6 contributing buildings and 1 contributing object that form the historic core of the Elon College campus.  They are the West Dormitory (1907), and five buildings built between 1923-1927 which form an H-shaped complex: Alamance Building, Whitley Auditorium, Carlton Library, Duke Science Building, and Mooney Building.  The object is a monument erected in 1929. All of the buildings are three-story red brick buildings of Colonial Revival / Georgian Revival design.

It was added to the National Register of Historic Places in 1988.

References

Historic districts on the National Register of Historic Places in North Carolina
University and college buildings on the National Register of Historic Places in North Carolina
Georgian Revival architecture in North Carolina
Colonial Revival architecture in North Carolina
Historic districts in Alamance County, North Carolina
National Register of Historic Places in Alamance County, North Carolina